Sinking of the Lusitania: Terror at Sea (also known as Lusitania: Murder on the Atlantic, and, in German: Der Untergang der Lusitania: Tragödie eines Luxusliners) is an English-German docu-drama produced in 2007. This 90-minute film is a dramatisation of the sinking of the RMS Lusitania on 7 May 1915 by a German U-boat, .

The Lusitania scenes were filmed with full-scale sections of the ship off the coast of South Africa while the U-20 scenes were filmed at Bavaria Studios in Munich using the then-newly refurbished 25-year-old U-boat set, studio model and full-size prop originally built for Das Boot.

Full cast

RMS Lusitania
John Hannah as Professor Ian Holbourn
Kenneth Cranham as Captain William Turner
Madeleine Garrood as Avis Dolphin
Graham Hopkins as Staff captain James C. Anderson, First Officer
Kevin Otto as Alfred Vanderbilt
Karen Haacke as Dorothy Taylor
Frances Marek as Alice Robinson
Aiden Lithgow as Tom Robinson
Robyn LeAnn Scott as Margaret "Peggy" Brownlie
André Weideman as Quartermaster Hugh Johnston, Helmsman
Rory Acton Burnell as Robert Leith, Senior Radio Officer
Andrew Whaley as Archibald Bryce, Chief Engineer 
Daniel Fox as Leslie N. Morton, Able-bodied Seaman

U-20
Florian Panzner  as Kapitänleutnant Walther Schwieger, Commanding Officer
Peter Benedict as Steuermann der Reserve Rudolf Lanz, Maritime Pilot
Adrian Topol as Bootsmann Charles Vögele, Quartermaster
Maik van Epple as Oberleutnant zur See Raimund Weisbach, Torpedo Officer

British Admiralty
Michael Feast as Captain Hobbs, Director of Naval Intelligence
Dean McCoubrey as Lieutenant Windridge, Hobbs' aide
Martin Le Maitre as Winston Churchill, First Lord of the Admiralty

Other
Ronald France as Lord Mersey, Wreck Commissioner of the United Kingdom
Stephen Jennings as Sir Edward Carson, Attorney-General representing Board of Trade
Erich Krieg as Fregattenkapitän Hermann Bauer, Commander of the German U-boat forces 
Grant Ross as British reporter
Rosemary Ryan as Nurse at Queenstown

Television premiere
It aired on the Discovery channel in the US on 13 May, on BBC 1 in the UK on 27 May 2007, in Germany on 28 December 2008 on ARD and on ABC1 in Australia on 11 January 2009 and the History Channel in New Zealand on 3 February 2009

References

External links
The Sinking of the Lusitania: Terror at Sea, Discovery Channel
Lusitania: Murder on the Atlantic, Discovery Channel Canada

British disaster films
British war drama films
British historical films
RMS Lusitania
World War I submarine films
World War I television films
2007 television films
2007 films
2000s war drama films
2000s historical films
World War I films based on actual events
Seafaring films based on actual events
Films about seafaring accidents or incidents
Films set in the Atlantic Ocean
Films set in 1915
2007 drama films
2000s British films
British drama television films